Barrick Gold Corporation is a mining company that produces gold and copper with 16 operating sites in 13 countries. It is headquartered in Toronto, Ontario, Canada. It has mining operations in Argentina, Canada, Chile, Côte d'Ivoire, Democratic Republic of the Congo, Dominican Republic, Mali, Papua New Guinea, Saudi Arabia, Tanzania, the United States and Zambia. In 2019, it produced 5.5 million ounces of gold at all-in sustaining costs of $894/ounce and 432 million pounds of copper at all-in sustaining costs of $2.52/pound.  the company had 71 million ounces of proven and probable gold reserves.

Barrick has met or beaten market consensus on its financial and operating results for eleven consecutive quarters as of Q3 2021.

Barrick had been the world's largest gold mining company until Newmont Corporation acquired Goldcorp in 2019. Barrick expects to produce between 4.6 and five million ounces of gold and between 440 and 500 million pounds of copper in 2020.

Chief executive Mark Bristow said in 2020 that Barrick has debated moving its primary stock listing to the New York Stock Exchange from the Toronto Stock Exchange, broadening its exposure to potential investors.

History

Founding and early years

Barrick Resources
Barrick Gold Corporation evolved from a privately held North American oil and gas company, Barrick Resources. After suffering financial losses in oil and gas, founder Peter Munk (1927–2018) decided to refocus the company on gold. Barrick Resources Corporation became a publicly traded company on May 2, 1983, listing on the Toronto Stock Exchange.

The company was set up not as a conventional mining company, but a mergers and acquisitions entity that bought mining companies.

1986 to 2005

Goldstrike 

In the 1980s, Barrick Gold purchased Goldstrike, which was a rapid success making Barrick one of the biggest gold mining companies globally.

American Barrick
Reflecting its identity as a North American producer, distinct from its South African competitors, the company's name was changed to American Barrick Resources in 1986. It was listed on the New York Stock Exchange in February 1987. Its name was changed to Barrick Gold Corporation in 1995.

Barrick Gold Corporation
American Barrick became the third-largest gold mining company in the world when it acquired Lac Minerals in 1994, which owned mining properties in North and South America. Two years later, in 1996, Arequipa Resources, owner of properties including the Pierina mine in Peru, accepted a takeover offer from the renamed Barrick Gold Corporation. A third acquisition followed in early 1999, when Barrick Gold acquired Sutton Resources Ltd., assuming ownership of properties in Tanzania. In 2001, Barrick acquired Homestake Mining Company for $2.3 billion in stock, then one of the oldest mining companies in the United States. The purchase made Barrick the second-largest gold producer in the world.

Placer Dome acquisition
In December 2005, Barrick launched a hostile takeover bid valued at US$9.2 billion for rival Canadian gold miner Placer Dome. The $10.4 billion transaction closed in December 2006. The procurement made Barrick the owner of the Porgera Gold Mine in Papua New Guinea. Shortly after the merger, Barrick, seeking increased profitability, terminated many of the staff at Placer Dome who led the community relations work.

2006 to present

African Barrick Gold
In February 2010, Barrick Gold announced plans to create a separate company to hold its assets in Tanzania, called African Barrick Gold. Barrick Gold would retain majority ownership in the new company, after its listing on the London Stock Exchange (LSE). African Barrick Gold was listed on the London Stock Exchange in mid-March 2010, with an IPO valuation at US$3.6 billion. The shares offered on the LSE raised just more than 500 million pounds. In June the company was admitted to the FTSE 100 Index.

Equinox Minerals
In April 2011, Barrick beat a takeover offer for Equinox Minerals by China Minmetals.

Shandong Gold
In 2018, John L. Thornton orchestrated a strategic “trust-based relationship” between Barrick Gold and Shandong Gold Group, a Chinese state-owned enterprise, establishing joint ownership of the Veladero mine to capitalize on Shandong's investor base, capital suppliers, political connections, and regional influence. In the press release announcing the partnership, Thornton said that Barrick and Shandong were looking forward to “sharing… capital in ways that will create added value for our respective owners, and our government and community partners in San Juan province”.

Randgold Resources
In September 2018, Barrick Gold announced an all-stock merger with Randgold Resources in a deal valued at $6.5 billion. Immediately following the announcement of the merger, Randgold shares rose 6% and Barrick shares rose 5.6%. The deal created the world's largest gold producer with the new company listed on the Toronto Stock Exchange and New York Stock Exchange. The companies began talking about a combination in 2015 and the deal was orchestrated by Barrick Executive Chairman John L. Thornton and Randgold Founder and CEO Mark Bristow.

Newmont Corporation
In February 2019, Barrick Gold announced a hostile $19 billion bid to acquire Newmont Mining Corporation, an American company based in Denver, Colorado. It was estimated that a merger could create $7 billion of value in operational synergies and would result in a 14% rise in Newmont's net asset value per share. The deal would have created a gold mining company with a market value of about $42 billion that some said would be a long-overdue restructuring of the global gold industry. Merging gold companies could make the industry more attractive to general investors as gold reserves are shrinking across the globe so fewer competitors could boost growth prospects. Newmont rejected the takeover offer and instead suggested the two companies' operations in Nevada, USA, be merged with Newmont CEO Gary Goldberg insisting that the joint venture be operated by Newmont with the two companies dividing the ownership equally. A joint venture was subsequently announced in March 2019 with Barrick as the operator owning 61.5% of the business.

Nevada Gold Mines
On July 1, 2019, Barrick and Newmont Corporation launch Nevada Gold Mines. The combined operation is the single largest gold mining complex in the world and employs more than 7,000 people. It combined the mines Goldstrike, Cortez, Turquoise Ridge, and Goldrush from Barrick and Newmont's Carlin, Twin Creeks, Phoenix, Long Canyon sites, plus the associated processing plants and infrastructure of both companies. The joint venture was created after Barrick gave up a takeover bid for Newmont in early 2019.

Nevada Gold Mines in total comprises 10 underground and 12 opencast mines, two autoclave facilities, two roasting facilities, four oxide mills, a flotation plant and five heap leach facilities. Barrick owns 61.5% of the joint venture and operates the business, while Newmont owns 38.5%. It was estimated that $500 million could be saved by creating the joint venture in average annual synergies during the first five years of operating the joint venture. After its first year of operation, $35 million in operating and management costs were saved. Over 20 years, it is estimated that $4.7 billion of total savings will be realised.

Reko Diq Project

Pakistan plans to grant Barrick a mining lease, exploration license and surface rights to restart the Reko Diq copper-gold project, it was announced in March 2022. The project when in production has the potential to be one of the top five gold-copper mines in the world. It has the potential to produce 250,000 ounces of gold and 200,000 tons of copper every year for more than half a century and could be in production by 2027. It was estimated that the project site contains up to 42 million ounces of gold and 54 billion pounds of copper in a study done in 2010. The mineral deposit was discovered at the foot of an extinct volcano in the 2000s. Work on the project was stopped in 2011 when a mining license to develop the Reko Diq mine was refused to be granted by Pakistani authorities. Ownership of the mine is to be split evenly between Pakistan and Barrick, which are investing about $10 billion in the project, which is the single largest investment in the country. About 8,000 jobs are expected to be created and about $1 billion will be invested in a new mining technical school along with hospital, schools and roads in the province of Balochistan, which is poor and sparsely populated. Construction of the mine will take place in two phases beginning with a processing plant with the capacity of 40 million tonnes per year and doubling five years after being commissioned.

The federal government of Pakistan and provincial government of Baluchistan have called the agreement with Barrick Gold to develop the Reko Diq copper-gold project the largest investment pact they have ever made. The agreement signed in December 2022 has the province of Baluchistan owning 10% of the project on a free carried basis, 15% on a fully funded basis, 25% by three state-owned enterprises, and 50% by Barrick Gold. Next steps to ramp-up the project include completing the updated feasibility study by the end of 2024 with first production of gold and copper to occur in 2028.

Berkshire Hathaway 
Berkshire Hathaway disclosed that it purchased $562 million in shares of Barrick during the second quarter of 2020, immediately making it the eleventh-largest shareholder in the company. The new position is 20.9 million shares, which is 1.2% of the company's outstanding stock. Berkshire CEO Warren Buffett and his key business partner Charlie Munger have a history of dismissing gold as an attractive investment, saying a fine business run by good managers with cash flows and paying dividends is more productive than the precious metal. Buffett has previously said owning shares of quality companies is more valuable than owning gold itself. Buffett later sold his entire stake in the company.

Carbon footprint
Barrick Gold reported Total CO2e emissions (Direct + Indirect) for 31 December 2020 at 7,351 Kt. It has set a greenhouse gas emissions reduction target of 30% and will be net-zero carbon emissions by 2050. At its operations in the United States, Barrick is transitioning away from coal to natural gas and solar power, in an effort to reduce emissions. Mining companies had been coming under pressure from climate-focused investors to set decarbonization targets. The global mining industry including its biggest companies like Rio Tinto, BHP and Anglo American is responsible for 4% to 7% of greenhouse gas emissions globally.

Operations

Gold

Copper

Former operations

Mining practices
Environmental and human rights violations have taken place around a number of mining operations that are now closed or were previously operated by a different company, including violence in Papua New Guinea and Tanzania. Forty people were arrested in Chile following a demonstration against the potential environmental impacts of a mining project that has not been built. Executives of Acacia Mining, which had mining operations in Tanzania and was acquired in 2019, had faced charges of bribery, conspiracy, forgery, money-laundering, tax-evasion and environmental damage. There has also been small groups of opposition in the Dominican Republic.

Voluntary Principles on Security and Human Rights
In 2010, Barrick Gold Corporation became the 18th company to join the Voluntary Principles on Security and Human Rights which provides "guidance to extractives companies on maintaining the security of their operations in a manner that respects human rights and fundamental freedoms." Admission follows an eight step process that requires approval by the Voluntary Principles plenary, the main decision-making body, consisting of all active members, drawn from participating governments, companies and non-governmental organizations. Barrick Gold participates in a number of corporate social responsibility programs, such as the United Nations Global Compact. The company is a signatory to the Extractive Industries Transparency Initiative. It also participates in The Global Reporting Initiative, Business for Social Responsibility and The Global Business Coalition on HIV/Aids, Tuberculosis and Malaria. On September 7, 2007, Barrick was added to the Dow Jones Sustainability Index. The company is a member of The International Leadership Council (ILC) of The Nature Conservancy. In Papua New Guinea, the Porgera Joint Venture participated in the development of a wildlife conservation area in the Kaijende Highlands.

Argentina

Environment
Between 2015 and 2017, three separate incidents occurred where processing solution escaped the leach pad area. In September 2015, 1,072m3 of processing solution was released from a faulty valve on a pipe going to the heap leach pad and was not diverted to the tailings storage facility because of a malfunctioning gate. In September 2016, a pipe carrying processing solution was struck by falling ice that had rolled down a slope, and in March 2017, a pipe carrying a mixture of rocks came loose. After the first accident in 2015, local judge Pablo Oritja of Argentina indicted nine employees, and a fine of $9.8 million was levied. Authorities in San Juan province responded with plans to re-engineer some operational and environmental processes at the mine, which were audited by local and international experts. The National Observer obtained court documents with allegations from a former employee that his employment was terminated soon after concerns were raised about health and safety and environmental practices in 2014.

2016 Class Action Lawsuit
A U.S. class-action lawsuit was launched in 2016 accusing the company of fraudulently inflating its market value by concealing problems at Pascua Lama, a South American mine under development. Development of the mine was indefinitely halted on October 31, 2013, and people who purchased shares between May 7, 2009, and November 1, 2013, were part of the class-action lawsuit. Development was halted for a number of issues including cost overruns, environmental concerns and the falling price of gold that would have made the operation less economical. A $140 million settlement was reached two months later with no charges of wrongdoing or liability and the company stating the claims alleged by the lead plaintiffs are unfounded.

Canada

Talonbooks
In February 2010, lawyers for Barrick Gold threatened to sue the Canadian publisher Talonbooks for defamation if it proceeded with plans to publish the book Imperial Canada Inc.: Legal Haven of Choice for the World's Mining Industries by Alain Deneault. Publisher Karl Siegler described this as "libel chill," pointing out that since the book had not yet been published, Barrick Gold could not know whether or not its contents actually constituted defamation. Subsequently, Talon decided to publish the work and "issued a statement saying they 'intend to show the complete manuscript to Barrick prior to the book's release, to allow Barrick the opportunity to "correct" any "falsehoods" about how they conduct their business affairs, worldwide, that they feel it may contain.'"

Noir Canada
A 2011 decision in Quebec Superior Court had ruled that Barrick Gold had to pay $143,000 to authors Alain Deneault, Delphine Abadie, William Sacher, and publisher Les Éditions Écosociété Inc to prepare their defense in a "seemingly abusive" strategic lawsuit against public participation. Despite the Québec ruling, a book "Noir Canada" documenting the relationship between Canadian mining corporations, armed conflict, and political actors in Africa was never published as part of a settlement which, according to the authors, was only made for the sole purpose of resolving the three-and-a-half year legal battle.

Papua New Guinea - Porgera Gold Mine

Human Rights Abuses
In 2011, Human Rights Watch, a New York City-based international non-governmental organization that conducts research on human rights, found a pattern of abuses perpetrated by private and public law-enforcement personnel in 2009 and 2010 in the Porgera Gold Mine in Papua New Guinea. Human Rights Watch says that violent insecurity is a “chronic problem” around Porgera due to people engaging in illegal mining and continuously raiding various areas of the mining property including the open pit, stockpile areas for rock, waste dumps, and underground tunnels. Human Rights Watch said the government of Papua New Guinea has “consistently failed” to maintain law and order in the area and that responsible government regulation was the one essential component still lacking to manage the unstable social situation in the area. On the same day Human Rights Watch published its report, the company said it had been working with Human Rights Watch for six months on a series of actions in response to the investigation, which included improvements to the security environment, enhanced human rights training, and grievance mechanisms. A “remedy framework” called the Porgera Remedy Framework was set up as an alternative to the local judicial system to deliver compensation packages.

In June 2014, Amnesty International reported that local police forced evictions by way of arson from land adjacent to the mine. The report said that community leaders presumed the alleged actions by the police were an effort to prevent illegal mining.

In 2022 Canadaland reported that hundreds of women reported being raped at the mine by security contractors. According to journalist Richard Poplak, interviewed by Canadland in 2022, guards at the mine used sexual violence against women as a policy to deter them from the mine. The policy, according to Poplak, started in 2003 or 2004 (before Barrick's ownership) and increased in implementation after Barrick bought the mine.

Peter Munk prevented intervention by a shareholder proxy from speaking at the 2008 shareholder meeting about her reports of deadly violence and sexual violence from security contractors and took until 2010 to accept the reports were true. A compensation scheme was set up and paid 119 survivors of sexual violence around CAD$8,000 per person on the condition that they agreed not to sue Barrick Gold.

Ownership 
Soon after the Human Rights Watch 2011 publication, the mine, which was owned jointly by Barrick, Zijin Mining Group of China, and local landowners through Mineral Resources Enga, was nationalized by the government of Papua New Guinea under Prime Minister James Marape when the government did not renew the mining lease, and it expired in August 2019. The gold mine, which contributes about 10% of Papua New Guinea's total exports, was seen by Prime Minister James Marape as a way for the country to get a greater share of its major natural resource projects. In response, Barrick Gold sued the government in the Papua New Guinea courts and in an industrial tribunal. The government backed down after negotiating a greater ownership share in the joint venture.

Environmental concerns 
The mine has, for many years, been severely contaminating the Porgera River, adjacent rivers, and the Gulf of Papua.

Peru
In February 2021, Barrick Gold announced it would sell its Lagunas Norte mine in Peru. The mine is sold to Boroo Pte Ltd. for up to US$81 million.

Water
The BBC reported in September 2012 that one person was killed and at least four more were injured at the Barrick Pierina mine in the northern Ancash region of Peru in clashes between national police and members of a neighboring community who were protesting the mine's alleged over-consumption and contamination of local water sources during a drought. Villagers from the communities of Mareniyoc and San Isidro blocked an access road to the mine and entered the property by forcing open the mine gate. Community members asked that the mine provide the communities with drinking water. Operations at the mine resumed after two days.

United States

Cortez Hills
Through 2009 and into 2010, Barrick Gold's Cortez Hills project was the subject of litigation in Nevada, seeking to block the project. Opponents appealed to the United States Court of Appeals for the Ninth Circuit, challenging a ruling in the United States District Court for the District of Nevada, which denied the bid to block the project. The Appeals Court "upheld a federal judge's finding that opponents of the mine failed to prove they were likely to prevail on claims the mine would cause visual harm to Mount Tenabo and create a substantial burden on the tribes' ability to exercise their religion" but ruled the U.S. Bureau of Land Management's previous environmental review of water and air pollution impacts "was inadequate under the National Environmental Policy Act" and ordered the District Court to provide "appropriate" injunctive relief while the Bureau of Land Management conducted further study. In March 2011 the Bureau of Land Management approved a subsequent study on environmental impacts, allowing the mine to operate as originally proposed.

Western Shoshone
In 2008, the company negotiated an agreement with four of five regional Western Shoshone tribes, providing financial resources for education and wellness initiatives, including a long-term scholarship program, allocated at the Tribes' discretion. A former tribal chairman of the Duck Valley Shoshone spoke of the company as "a pretty progressive entity." In British Columbia the Tahltan Nation has thanked the company for encouraging local sustainable development while operating the Eskay Creek mine from 2001 to 2008.

See also

 Gregory Charles Wilkins
 Porgera Gold Mine
 Pueblo Viejo mine
 Veladero mine

References

Further reading

External links

 
 

 
Canadian companies established in 1983
Companies based in Toronto
Companies listed on the Toronto Stock Exchange
Gold mining companies of Canada
Non-renewable resource companies established in 1983
S&P/TSX 60
Silver mining companies of Canada
1983 establishments in Canada
Gold mining companies of the Democratic Republic of the Congo